VJ's Drive Inn is a burger joint in Winnipeg, Manitoba, Canada, located at 170 Main Street.

Overview 
The restaurant initially opened as Juniors in 1958, the name of the restaurant changed to VJ's Drive Inn in 1980.

The restaurant is owned by John Calogeris whose father was Nick Calogeris (b. Spiros Calogeris). Nick Calogeris was involved with many Winnipeg restaurants, such as The Manhattan, the Original Food Bar, BBQ Restaurant, and Kit Kat Grill. John Calogeris' two partners—John and Gus Razos—are his cousins.

Because the restaurant only has outdoor seating, all orders are take-out and are packaged into traditional fold-up boxes.

References

Companies based in Winnipeg
Buildings and structures in downtown Winnipeg
Tourist attractions in Winnipeg